Namrata Shrestha is a Nepalese actress and model. 

Since debuting in Alok Nembang's Sano Sansar in 2008, Shrestha has gone on to appear in a number of commercial Nepali-language films as a sought-after model and actor.

Career
In 2008, Shrestha appeared alongside Karma in the romantic comedy Sano Sansar, where she played the character of Ritu. Shrestha was new to acting and was selected for the role despite her lack of experience.

Shrestha then appeared as Sikha in the 2009 romantic comedy Mero Euta Saathi Chha.

In 2010, Shrestha debuted in her first theater performance, Jalpari.

Since then, Shrestha has appeared in a string of high-profile films, including the Nigam Shrestha-helmed Chhadke alongside Saugat Malla, Dayahang Rai and Robin Tamang; Maun where she plays a mute woman.
 
In 2015, Shrestha starred in the film Soul Sister, playing two characters. The film also marked her debut as a singer for the song 'Bistarai Bistarai'. The following year, in 2016, Shrestha starred in the movie Classic, again alongside Aryan Sigdel. Her role in the film earned her a Dcine Award for Best Actor in a Leading Role (Female) and the National Film Award for Best Actress.

Shrestha then starred in the movie Prasad to widespread critical acclaim. Shrestha once again won the Dcine Award for Best Actor in a Leading Role (Female) for her portrayal of Narayani in the film.  

In 2019, Shrestha starred in the action movie Xira, where she did all of her own stunts and shaved off her hair. The film was not well-received with the Kathmandu Post summing up "Xira the film won’t let you admire Xira the character"

Personal life 
Namrata Shrestha was born in Dharan on 14 June 1985.

Filmography

Theatre appearances

Awards and nominations

References

External links

 

Nepalese film actresses
Living people
Nepalese female models
People from Dharan
Nepalese stage actresses
21st-century Nepalese actresses
1985 births
Nepalese child actresses